The Rowing Association of American Colleges (1870 to 1894) the first collegiate athletic organization in the United States, was a body governing college rowing. Upon organization by the captains of the leading crews of the day, they devised a primary rule of eligibility: that only undergraduate students should be eligible to represent their college in the regatta. To this day, despite numerous amendments and additions, this rule remains the very foundation of the NCAA rules of eligibility.

Collegiate regatta

This table lists the winners of the marquee events of the championship regattas conducted by the RAAC from its founding through 1894.

On June 30, 1876 Harvard and Yale raced eight-oared boats with coxswains over a 4-mile course on the Connecticut River.Afterward "the Harvard six left for Saratoga. Yale does not row there, and Harvard will not after this year, but the eight-oared bout between Yale and Harvard, so successfully inaugurated to-day, will undoubtedly become an annual and permanent institution."

From 1871 to 1875 Harvard and Yale did not race head-on. Both participated in the RAAC university race from 1872 to 1875 (as Harvard did also in 1871 and 1876), and the Harvard–Yale Regatta  recognizes Harvard–Yale varsity races to be incorporated in those RAAC championships.

Notes

See also
 Intercollegiate Rowing Association 
 Poughkeepsie Regatta 
 National Association of Amateur Oarsmen
  1872 National Association of Amateur Oarsmen.  The Effect of New York's Elite Athletic Clubs

References

College rowing in the United States
1870 establishments in the United States
1894 disestablishments in the United States